The Indian 1-rupee coin (₹1) is an Indian coin worth one Indian rupee and is made up of a hundred paisas. Currently, one rupee coin is the  smallest Indian coin in circulation. Since 1992, one Indian rupee coins are minted from stainless steel. In independent India, one rupee coins was first minted in 1950 and is currently in circulation.

History

Sur Empire
Sher Shah Suri, the founder of the Sur Empire ruled North India from 1540 to 1545 AD. During his reign, Suri issued pure silver coins in 1542 and named it Rupiya (from Sanskrit रौप्य, raupya, meaning silver). The denomination remained in usage through the Mughal, Maratha, East India company and British rules. The rupiya was retained by the East India company till 1835 and formed the basis of the British Raj currency till 1947. The sub-unit of rupyia were copper pieces and 40 copper pieces constituted as one rupiya. Sher Shah Suri named the copper pieces as Paisa.

Danish, Dutch, French and Portuguese India
Each minted their own coinage, with Danish India using Fano; French India: Roupie and fanon till 1954; Portuguese India rupia till 1958, ...

British East India company
In 1717 AD, the East India Company obtained permission from the Mughal emperor Farrukhsiyar to coin Mughal style currency, at their Bombay factory. In 1835 AD, the Coinage Act of 1835 for uniform coinage came into force. The reverse of all one rupee coins minted after 1835 and before 1862 AD bore "East India Company" instead of the Mughal Empire. The one rupee coins had bust of King William IIII (IV minted as IIII) and were first minted in 1835 AD. Rupee coins issued after 1840 bore the busts of Queen Victoria (1840 to 1901 AD).

The East India Company wanted to introduce the Pound sterling in India, due to the popularity of the Rupiya, the Pound sterling could not be introduced in India.

Madras Presidency
The Madras Presidency issued one rupee coins until 1815 AD. One rupee was equal to twelve fanams.

British Raj (1858-1947)
The British Raj started in India in 1858 AD and lasted until Indian independence in 1947. In 1862, new one rupee coins were issued, were known as the Regal issue, bore the bust of Queen Victoria on the obverse and "India" minted on the reverse side. The obverse side of the coins featured the busts of Queen Victoria (1862 to 1901 AD), Edward VII (1903 to 1910 AD), George V (1911 to 1936 AD) and George VI (1938 to 1947 AD). Edward VIII was never featured on any one rupee coin since his reign (Jan-Dec 1936 AD) was short.

Due to World War I and II, there was a shortage of silver. As a result of the shortage, 0.917 silver one rupee coins were replaced by Quaternary silver alloy (0.500) in 1940. In 1947, the silver one rupee coin was replaced by nickel coins.

Princely States
Several Princely States issued their own currency, on the demise of the Mughal empire, with Hyderabad state issuing its own Hyderabadi rupee, between 1918 and 1959. As did: Alwar, Ambliara, Awadh, Bahawalpur, Bharatpur, Bikanir, Bund, Chuda, Dhar, Indergadh, Jaisalmer, Jaora, Junagadh, Kalat, Kutch, Mangrol, Mengani, Muli, Mysore, Nawanagar, Palitana, Rajkot, Ramgarh, Sailana, Sayala and several others.

One rupee coinage from 1835 to 1947

Independent India
On 15 August 1947, India obtained independence and the monetary system and coinage of the British Raj were retained. It was not until 15 August 1950 that India introduced new coins. Introduction of new coins (including one rupee coin) was done in following chronology and reasons;

Motifs and symbol of sovereignty were adapted to represent Indian independence.
Introduction of metric system and related impact on Indian coinage.
Changes due to metallic value of coins.
"Coinisation" of currency notes for cost-benefit.

Subunits
From 1947 to 1957, the Indian rupee was not decimalised and was divided into 16 annas. Each anna was further divided to four Indian pices (from 1835 to 1947, each pice was divided into three Indian pies; till the pie was demonetized in 1947). Table below shows sub-units of one rupee (1835–present).

Mintage

Mintage
As of 2020, one rupee coins are minted by the India Government Mints in Mumbai, Kolkata, Hyderabad and in Noida. All coins are circulated only through the Reserve Bank of India.

Mint marks
The following mint marks have been used on one rupee coins since 1947.

See also
Indian 2-rupee note
Indian 1-rupee note

References

One-base-unit coins
Coins of India
Rupee